Stephan Klossner (born 30 May 1981 in Bern, Switzerland) is a Swiss professional football referee. He has been a full international for FIFA since 2012.

References 

1981 births
Living people
Swiss football referees